Bhadrakalpikasūtra (Sanskrit) is a  Mahāyāna sutra with 24 chapters written in c. 200-250 CE, said to have been taught by Gautama Buddha in Vaishali. It includes the  names of the 1002 Buddhas of this "Fortunate Aeon." The title of this text means the Fortunate Aeon Sūtra.

In 2017,  United States Representative, Colleen Hanabusa, was sworn in on a copy of the Fortune Aeon.

The thousand buddhas

The list of 1002 (or 1004) names starts with:

 Krakucchanda
 Kanakamuni
 Kashyapa
 Shakyamuni
 Maitreya

... and ends with ...

 Harivaktra
 Chuda and
 Rocha

It is included in the first volume of the sutra section of the Kangyur of Tibetan Buddhism. It is also available in Chinese, Tibetan, Mongolian, and other languages in variants that differ slightly as to the number of Tathāgatas enumerated. For example, the Khotanese version is the proponent of a 1005-Tathāgata system.

Dharmarakṣa, a native of Dunhuang, between third and fourth centuries had translated the Bhadrakalpikasutra into Classical Chinese. Note that "A cave of the Thousand-Buddhas" is the name of the world-renowned grottoes at Dunhuang.
Vidyakarasimha and Dpal-dbyans translated the text into Tibetan.

The original Sanskrit text is now lost.

See also 
 Mahayana sutras
 Heart Sutra
 Samantabhadra Meditation Sutra

Notes

External links 

 [Tripiṭaka. Sūtrapiṭaka. Bhadrakalpikasūtra.  http://beta.worldcat.org/archivegrid/collection/data/840923226] 
 Tabo skor lam: inner walls On the inner walls of the ambulatory the sequence of the Buddhas of the Bhadrakalpikasūtra continues Tabo Monastery

Mahayana sutras
Vaipulya sutras